Acuston is a monospecific genus in the family Brassicaceae which is found in Greece, Lebanon, and Syria. Acuston perenne has one accepted infraspecific, the subspecies obovatum which is found only in certain parts of Lebanon and Syria.

References

Brassicaceae
Flora of Lebanon and Syria
Monotypic Brassicaceae genera